Adventures of Ricky Deen is an upcoming Sri Lankan Sinhalese thriller mystery film directed and produced by Boodee Keerthisena. It stars Mahendra Perera in lead role along with Sangeetha Weeraratne and Darshan Dharmaraj in supportive roles. Music composed by Lakshman Joseph De Saram.

The film has been shot entirely on Apple IPhone.

Plot

Cast
 Mahendra Perera as Ricky Deen
 Sangeetha Weeraratne as Lady Godiva
 Darshan Dharmaraj as Driver
 Dasun Pathirana as Angry actor
 Shalani Tharaka as Star
 Samanalee Fonseka as Brave
 Palitha Silva as Heavies
 Rohan Jayalath		
 Buddhima De Mel		
 Jayalath Rohitha
 Derek Wikramanayeka
 Senaka De Silva

References

External links
 
 

Sinhala-language films